Sam Houston was an important figure in Texas history.

Named in his honor are:
Houston, Texas, the largest city in the state and fourth largest in the United States
Houston, Mississippi
Houston, Missouri
Houston County, Minnesota
Houston County, Tennessee 
Houston County, Texas
Houston Street in New Haven, Connecticut
Sam Houston Tollway in Houston, Texas
Fort Sam Houston in San Antonio, Texas
Sam Houston State University in Huntsville, Texas
Several high schools named Sam Houston High School
Sam Houston Elementary School in Maryville, Tennessee
Sam Houston National Forest in Texas
Sam Houston Coliseum in Houston, Texas
Sam Houston Park, Houston, Texas
Sam Houston Ship Channel Bridge, a bridge in Harris County, Texas
Sam Houston Regional Library and Research Center in Liberty County, Texas
Sam Houston Drive in Victoria,Texas
Houston Highway/ U.S. Highway 59/ Future Interstate Highway 69 in Victoria,Texas

See also
United States Navy ships USS Sam Houston
Sam Houston (disambiguation)

Lists of places in the United States
Lists of places named after people
Houston
Sam Houston